Brommaplan metro station is a station on the Green line of the Stockholm metro. It is located in the district of Riksby, which is part of the borough of Bromma in the west of the city of Stockholm. The station is elevated and has a single island platform, with access from a lower level station building.

The station lies on the route of a line known as the  that formerly linked Alvik and Islandstorget. The Ängbybanan, which included the elevated tracks at Brommaplan now used by the metro, was designed and built for use by the future metro, but was operated from 1944 as part of line 11 of the Stockholm tramway. Brommaplan station was inaugurated as part of the metro on 26 October 1952 with the conversion of the Ängbybanan and its extension to form the metro line between Hötorget and Vällingby.

As part of Art in the Stockholm metro project, the station received a composition in glass, stainless sheet metal and aluminium referring to the history of aviation and the nearby Bromma Airport. The artwork was created by Peter Svedberg and installed in 1996

Gallery

References

Green line (Stockholm metro) stations
Railway stations opened in 1952